The 2013–14 Drake Bulldogs men's basketball team represented Drake University during the 2013–14 NCAA Division I men's basketball season. The Bulldogs, led by first year head coach Ray Giacoletti, played their home games at the Knapp Center and were members of the Missouri Valley Conference. They finished the season 15–16, 6–12 in MVC play to finish in a tie for eighth place. They lost in the first round of the Missouri Valley tournament to Evansville.

Roster

Schedule

|-
!colspan=9 style="background:#000070; color:#FFFFFF;"| Exhibition

|-
!colspan=9 style="background:#000070; color:#FFFFFF;"| Regular season

|-
!colspan=9 style="background:#000070; color:#FFFFFF;"| 2014 Missouri Valley tournament

References

Drake Bulldogs men's basketball seasons
Drake
Drake
Drake